This is a list of Danish television related events from 1987.

Events
28 February - Anne-Cathrine Herdorf & Bandjo are selected to represent Denmark at the 1987 Eurovision Song Contest with their song "En lille melodi". They are selected to be the twentieth Danish Eurovision entry during Dansk Melodi Grand Prix held at the Tivolis Koncertsal in Copenhagen.

Debuts

Television shows

Births
8 February - Esben Bjerre Hansen, TV & radio host
25 June - Joakim Ingversen, TV host & actor

Deaths

See also
1987 in Denmark